Gulf University for Science & Technology (GUST) is the first private university established in Kuwait. It has a dual-enrollment agreement with the University of Missouri–St. Louis.

History 
The university was to be a supplement to Kuwait University, the only institution of higher education in Kuwait at that time, and to serve the educational demands of the local society and the Persian Gulf region. In January 1997, Kuwaiti Academic Group, composed of 41 faculty members from Kuwait University, was founded to lay the foundation for the proposed “University of the Future.” Their studies culminated in a vision of the “Gulf University for Science & Technology.”

A partnership was established with the University of Missouri at St. Louis (UMSL), the international counterpart university chosen to help bring the university to fruition. The development was facilitated by the Private Universities Decree, No. 34, issued by the State of Kuwait in 2000, resulting in the establishment of a temporary campus in Hawally. The issuance of Emiri Decree No. 156 in 2002 completed the legal establishment of GUST as the first private university in the State of Kuwait and permitted the start of the first academic year in 2002–2003.

At its first commencement ceremony in June 2007, GUST conferred diplomas on approximately four hundred graduates.

Admissions and registration

Admissions 
Admission to GUST is on a competitive basis. Applicants are reviewed based on high school performance and achievement on the GUST English and Mathematics Placement Tests. Applicants are encouraged to submit the results of a Test of English as a Foreign Language (TOEFL). Test scores must be no more than two years old at the time of application. Students who do not have a valid TOEFL score must take the GUST English Placement Test.

Academic services

Scholarships and student employment 
 Kuwait Ministry of Higher Education (Private Universities Council) Scholarships
 GUST Scholarships
 GUST Summer Scholarship (for Study at UMSL)
 Student Employment

Center for Career Services and Alumni (CCSA) 
The Center of Career Services and Alumni provides career-planning services to GUST students and alumni.

A. M. Al-Refai Library 
GUST's library was established in 2002 to serve the university faculty, staff, students, and alumni.

On June 20, 2006, the library was renamed the Abdullah Mubarak Al-Refai (A. M. Al-Refai) Library in honor of the late Dr. Abdullah Mubarak Al-Refai, President from 2003–2005.

The library has books, e-books, journals, e-journals, audiovisual materials, and bibliographic/full-text databases. The library has a collection of 19,000 book titles, 115,000 scholarly journals (including open access titles) in digital format, 194,000 e-Books, and 82 bibliographic and full-text databases.

Study areas and discussion rooms are provided on the lower level of the library for women and upper level for men. Wireless network access is available throughout the library; there are 120 computer workstations for research and to access information. A network printing facility is available.

The following services are available for the GUST Community users:
Borrowing service, information and reference service, Ask a Librarian service, Library instruction and information literacy, TeamSpot Service, Access to the online library catalog, and the electronic resources available on the library website.

The library provides off-campus access to  its subscribed electronic resources only to enrolled students, faculty, and staff.

Multimedia Educational Unit 
The unit is involved in the following activities:
Digital imaging, video and audio, screen and interface design, website design, animation, as well as graphic design, including design of brochures, publications, booklets, logos, posters, illustrations and diagrams.

Office of Student Affairs 
The Office of Student Affairs (OSA) supports the educational and personal development of students at GUST and to encourage students’ personal growth. OSA is a main source of information regarding university policies and procedures that can affect students’ university lives.

GUST athletics 
GUST offers athletic programs for men and women in the following sports:
 Men football (soccer) and GUST women football (soccer)
 Men handball
 Men volleyball and GUST women volleyball
 Men and women tennis
 Men and women table tennis
 Men and women basketball
 Men squash

The Falcons won the 4th annual UCC 2009 tournament organized every year between university teams.

GUST Music Club 
The music club is composed of a group of students who play instruments including the oud, guitar, tabla, piano, drums, organ and violin. GUST Music Club has performed oriental, classical and traditional pieces for the GUST and larger Kuwaiti community. The GUST Music Club also took part in the activities of the Halla February festival and performed at GUST commencement celebrations.

GUST Art Club 
The art club offers non-credit classes to GUST students with an interest in developing their artistic abilities. Classes include painting (gauche, water color, acrylic and oil), drawing and painting (on glass, ceramic, silk and wood), sketching, and decoupage. All classes are given in the North Campus. Materials and equipment are provided by GUST.

The club organizes annual art exhibitions for students and university staff, and has participated in off-campus art exhibitions including the Kuwaiti Art Association Exhibition, the Youth and Sports Ministry Exhibition, Al-Qurain Exhibition and the National Assembly Exhibition.

GUST IT Club 
IT Club strengthens camaraderie among GUST students by providing activities that will help them improve their skills in technical areas relevant to the IT field.

College of Arts & Sciences 
The College of Arts and Sciences has five departments:
 Department of Computer Science
 Department of English
 English, Linguistics-Translation
 English Literature
 English Education
 Department of Humanities and Social Sciences
 Department of Mass Communication and Multimedia
 Department Of Mathematics & Natural Sciences

College of Business Administration 
 Undergraduate Degree Programs
The College of Business Administration comprises four departments: Accounting, Business Administration, Economics and Finance, and Management Information Systems (MIS), and six degree programs. GUST students are able to major in business fields including:
 Accounting
 Business Administration with emphasis in one of the following areas:
 International Business
 Management and Organizational Behavior
 Marketing
 Finance
 Management Information Systems
 Graduate Degree Programs
 Master's Degree in Business Administration

Campus facilities and services

Buildings and grounds 
The first phase of the Mishref campus was completed in 2007 and accommodates up to 3,400 students. Later phases will expand the University to accommodate more than 5,500 students. In Phase 2, the concourse will be extended for additional classrooms and other facilities including a multi-story structured parking garage.

The concourse 
The three-story concourse runs north-south [N1] and east-west [W1] and is accessed from the two parking areas and central VIP entrance. It provides covered access to all academic and social activities and is considered a focal point for gathering, information and social interaction.

Ground floor 
The Office of Admissions and Registration, Student Information Services (SIS), Public Relations and Marketing, and the University Library – Learning Resources Center are located near the VIP entrance.  Also close to the VIP entrance are two 125 seat lecture theaters available for teaching as well as for small-scale special presentations. Prayer rooms are located near the main entrances.

Parking and campus access 
Limited covered parking is available for students near the north and west entrances.  Part of the north parking lot is reserved for faculty and staff during regular university working hours.  Other non-covered parking is also available.  Access to the campus is provided from two main gates by smart cards, and a license plate recognition system.

Sports facilities 
The Physical Fitness and Health Center is connected to the north concourse at the ground and the first levels. The facility includes a 25 m indoor swimming pool with an overlooking seating area for special events. It contains an indoor basketball and volleyball court with seating area and digital score board.

Professional Advancement and Continuing Education 
GUST's Professional Advancement and Continuing Education (PACE) is connected to the main concourse. The center provides conference and training facilities for the community.  It consists of two auditoria, one with 500 seats and one with 200 seats, with committee rooms and space for exhibitions and events.

Health services 
GUST provides student health services at a clinic located in the Physical Fitness and Health Center and operated in conjunction with a local hospital. The clinic offers medical assistance for routine check-ups; however, students with any serious medical concern are referred to a local hospital or specialized medical facilities.

Security 
GUST has a security system related to fire prevention, fire-fighting safety advice and emergency evacuation procedures. Entrance and exit of people visiting GUST are monitored by security personnel, and identification is required to enter the premises. Campus facilities are protected by closed-circuit television.

GUST students are provided with student identity cards which are used to access campus facilities, obtain books from the library, and pay University fees.

Plasma screens 
Plasma screens throughout the campus display notices of events and are used to make university announcements.

Access for students with special needs 
All campus facilities are equipped with access ramps and elevators.

Bookstore 
The GUST bookstore provides course textbooks, reference materials and other supplies.

Food services 
Cafes and eating establishments are located along the concourse on the ground floor and offer meals, snacks, and beverages. GUST provides vending machines located along the campus and also there are eight restaurants and cafes in the campus, four in the North and four in the West area.

The restaurants and cafes are:
 Starbucks
 Caribou Coffee
 Pick
 Baker and Spice
 Trolley
 Laduree
 CAF CAFE
 EATALY
 Laduree

Shops 
Shops include:
 Digits: electronic shop
 Fono: mobile shop

Photocopying/printing 
A photocopying center is available for students from 8am – 8pm.  The library and all laboratories have access to networked printers for student use.

Smoke-free environment 
The campus is smoke-free.

Banking 
The university houses an automated teller machine provided by Boubyan Bank.

Technology at GUST 
The IT infrastructure has adopted Category 7 cable technology. Every seat in every classroom, laboratory and auditorium has a hard-wired connection to the internet. The wireless internet environment is provided throughout the buildings and external landscaped courtyards. By means of the IT set-up, faculty are able to control both the teaching media and the environmental conditions. The IT system also supports  building management and security facilities throughout the campus.

Computer laboratories
There are six computer laboratories located throughout the campus. These labs contain a variety of hardware, including printing and scanning capabilities, academic software, and high-speed access to the internet. A fiber optic networking infrastructure supports the computer labs and provides wireless network connectivity.

Information Technology Department Support Services
The Information Technology Department Support Services Division provides technical support for GUST students, faculty, and staff. The division maintains the computer labs and network and determines the GUST IT hardware and software requirements. It manages the GUST network security systems, oversees the wireless network system, and provides user accounts and e-mail services.

References

External links 
 Official website
 GUST Bulletin 2009–2010 University Bulletin |. Gust.edu.kw. Retrieved 21 October 2010.
 GUST Student Recruitment Drive 2016-2017 | Consumer Integrated Campaign
 Ministry of Higher Education, Kuwait Welcome to Ministry of Higher Education. Mohe.edu.kw. Retrieved 21 October 2010.
 Private Universities Council, Kuwait  
 University of Missouri-St. Louis 

 
Educational institutions established in 2002
2002 establishments in Kuwait
Technical universities and colleges